Andon Dimitrov - (January 1867 – 13 March 1933) was a Bulgarian revolutionary. He was among the founders of the Bulgarian Macedonian-Adrianople Revolutionary Committees.

Biography

Dimitrov was born to a rich Bulgarian family in the village of Ayvatovo (now a part of the municipality of Mygdonia, at the time in the Ottoman Empire). He graduated from the Bulgarian Men's High School of Thessaloniki in 1889 and then he studied law in Istanbul. He wasn't able to complete his studies due to a disease. He returned to Thessaloniki and taught Turkish in his old high school from 1892 to 1897. He also taught Bulgarian in the local Turkish gymnasium.

On 23 October 1893 Dimitrov, together with Hristo Tatarchev, Dame Gruev, Ivan Hadzhinikolov, Petar Poparsov and Hristo Batandzhiev put the beginnings of what would later be known the Internal Macedonian-Adrianople Revolutionary Organization (IMARO). Andon Dimitrov was a member of the organization's central committee from its very beginning; he was re-elected in the committee in 1896.

After 1897 Dimitrov got a teaching in Bitola in 1897. In 1899 he continued his law education in University of Liège and graduated in 1901. He returned to Bitola in November 1901 and started a career as a lawyer, while at the same time continuing his participation in the leadership of IMARO. In November 1903, Andonov was appointed a principal of all Bulgarian schools in Prilep. Andonov continued his career in law in 1904, when he was voted a judge in the Bitola appellate court. After the Young Turk Revolution he participated in the creation of the Bulgarian Constitutional Clubs political party, being chosen as its leader in its inauguration congress.

Andon Dimitrov moved to Bulgaria in 1913 and started to work in Ministry of Justice, and later in the Ministry of Foreign Affairs and Religious Denominations. Later in his life he taught Turkish in the Bulgarian Commerce school in Istanbul. Andon Dimitrov died on 13 March 1933 in Sofia.

References

1867 births
1933 deaths
People from Thessaloniki (regional unit)
Bulgarians from Aegean Macedonia
Members of the Internal Macedonian Revolutionary Organization
Macedonian Bulgarians
Bulgarian revolutionaries
Bulgarian educators
Bulgarian jurists
Istanbul University Faculty of Law alumni
University of Liège alumni
Bulgarian Men's High School of Thessaloniki alumni
Burials at Central Sofia Cemetery